Slovenian Bishops' Conference (SBC;) is the supreme authority of the Roman Catholic Church in Slovenia, which combines all the bishops of Slovenian dioceses and archdioceses: Archdiocese of Ljubljana, Archdiocese of Maribor, Diocese of Koper, Diocese of Novo Mesto, Diocese of Celje, and the Diocese of Murska Sobota. SBC territory coincides with the borders of the Republic of Slovenia.

A Conference of Bishops of a nation or territory in mutual unity, a hierarchical relationship with the Roman Pope, and in accordance with the 1983 Code of Canon Law (kann. 447–459), statutes and other legal norms exercise a pastoral office in this territory well-believers. Bishops' Conference is usually up to the successful implementation of the ministry and pastoral tasks in the area of all the dioceses of the same nation, but also for wider or narrower range than the national territory.

History

Slovenian Bishops' Conference has been set up on February 20, 1993. This follows the Slovenian Bishops together with the other bishops of the former Yugoslavia related to the Yugoslav Bishops' Conference, which was within the 20th June 1983 set up provincial Slovenian Bishops' Conference.

Slovenian bishops at its meeting on July 25, 1992 prepared a draft statute of an independent Slovenian Bishops' Conference.  Pope John Paul II (1978-2005), after obtaining a favorable opinion of the Congregation for Bishops and the Office for Relations with States at the National Registry of the Holy See, on February 19, 1993 in accordance with the norms of canon law and the provisions of the statutes approved independent Slovenian Bishops' Conference on February 20, 1993, the Vatican Congregation for Bishops issued a decree on its establishment. The Catholic Church in Slovenia has thus gained greater legal strength and independence.

SBC statute governing the nature and purposes of the Bishops' Conference, Plenary Session, provides for a permanent council of bishops, secretarial duties and other services and commission at the discretion of the conference provide a more efficient operation.

Members

Members of the Bishops' Conference, all the local bishops in geographical or ecclesiastical-administrative areas. Apart from them as well as assistant bishops, auxiliary bishops and bishops of the title before them the Holy See or the Bishops' Conference has entrusted the task specified in this territory. Others address the bishops and the Apostolic Nuncio not its members. Slovenian Bishops' Conference consists with 11 members:

Ordinaries 
 Msgr. Stanislav Zore OFM, Metropolitan Archbishop of Ljubljana
 Msgr. Alojzij Cvikl SJ, Metropolitan Archbishop of Maribor
 Msgr. Andrej Saje, Bishop of Novo Mesto and President of the SBC
 Msgr. Jurij Bizjak, Ph. D., Bishop of Koper
 Msgr. Peter Štumpf, SDB, Ph. D., Bishop of Murska Sobota and Vice-President of the SBC
 Msgr. Maksimilijan Matjaž, Th. D., Bishop of Celje

Auxiliary bishop 
 Msgr. Anton Jamnik, Ph. D., Auxiliary Bishop of Ljubljana
 Msgr. Franc Šuštar, Ph. D., Auxiliary Bishop of Ljubljana

Retired bishops 
 Msgr. Andrej Glavan, retired Bishop of Novo Mesto
 Msgr. Franc Kramberger, Ph. D., retired Archbishop of Maribor
 Msgr. Stanislav Lipovšek, Ph. D., retired Bishop of Celje
 Msgr. Cardinal Franc Rode, CM, Ph. D., retired Archbishop of Ljubljana
 Msgr. Anton Stres, CM, Ph. D., retired Archbishop of Ljubljana
 Msgr. Marjan Turnšek, Ph. D., retired Archbishop of Maribor

The plenary sessions of the Conference of Bishops have a clause statutes SBC decisive vote all members of the conference. Retired bishops may be invited to attend the plenary sessions of the conference, but not decisive voice.

Each conference shall elect a chairman and his deputy (Vice President) and General Secretary. SBC under the Statute, the President can only Bishop Ordinary who is elected to this function. The President leads the plenary sessions and the permanent council of bishops SBC. The Statute also provides for the vice-president (the task of the President when he is lawfully arrested) and the General Secretary. The Secretary General is a member of the conference, but it is always present at meetings.

Presidents
 Andrej Saje (since 2022)
 Stane Zore (2017–2022)
 Andrej Glavan (2013–2017)
 Anton Stres (2010–2013)
 Alojz Uran (2007–2010)
 Franc Kramberger (2004–2007)
 Franc Rode (1997–2004)
 Alojzij Šuštar (1993–1997)

See also
 Roman Catholicism in Slovenia

Notes

External links
 http://www.gcatholic.org/dioceses/conference/094.htm

Slovenia
Bishops' Conference
Christian organizations established in 1993